Argentine Socialist Vanguard Party (in Spanish: Partido Socialista Argentino de Vanguardia) was a political party in Argentina. PSAV was founded around 1960 as a leftist split from the Argentine Socialist Party (PSA). The founder of PSAV was Alexis Latendorff. The remaining PSA became known as 'PSA (Casa del Pueblo)'.

In the congress of PSAV in 1961 in Córdoba, PSAV explicitly adopted Marxism-Leninism and a politico-military revolutionary strategy.

PSAV later split up, into Popular Vanguard and Communist Vanguard.

Defunct political parties in Argentina
Defunct communist parties
Communist parties in Argentina
Political parties established in the 1960s
1960s establishments in Argentina
Political parties with year of disestablishment missing